The Blauhöhle is the largest cave system in the Swabian Alps in southern Germany. The Blauhöhle presumably originated in a time when the Danube still flowed through the Blau valley. Since the shifting of the Danube, several small rivers, the Schmiech, the Ach, and the Blau, have flowed through this valley. The cave system begins about 21 meters under water at the base of the Blautopf. It continues west and northwest, rising and falling several times until after a horizontal distance of about  it comes above the level of ground water and opens into the second big air-filled chamber.

This chamber was first discovered in 1985 by Jochen Hasenmayer, who named it Mörikedom (Mörike Cathedral, named after Eduard Mörike). Hasenmayer's diving accident in the Wolfgangsee resulted in a long break in its exploration. For several years the cave has been explored by the Arbeitsgemeinschaft Blautopf (Blautopf Study Group, or Consortium), a team of cave divers from several different regional groups. This group has made progress exploring the cave, including making exact measurements of the way to the Mörikedom. The improvement of underwater breathing technology, especially the rebreather, has allowed for longer dives carrying less weight. The discovery of the Wolkenschloss (Castle of Clouds), another large, air-filled cavern, and the so-called Landweg (land-way), a long, open cave river behind the Mörikedom, were great successes for the Arbeitsgemeinschaft.

Hasenmayer continued his attempts to explore the cave system in his cave submarine, Speleonaut.

Since 2002 the Arbeitsgemeinschaft Höhle und Karst Grabenstetten (Cave and Karst Consortium of Grabenstetten), as a part of their work on a neighboring cave system, the Vetterhöhle, have attempted to dig a dry entrance into the Blauhöhle. In 2006 several large caverns were discovered in the Vetterhöhle, and in the autumn a connection was discovered between the Vetterhöhle and the Wolkenschloss.

The groups are now also working with yet another Arbeitsgemeinschaft on a sinkhole north of Blaubeuren, which is believed to be connected with the Blauhöhle behind the Apokalypse.

References

External links
  Tourist Information page of the nearby city of Blaubeuren
  Homepage of the Arbeitsgemeinschaft Blautopf
  Results of diving explorations in the Blauhöhle with cave map
  Presentation of research in the Vetterhöhle
  Presentation of research in the Hessenhaudoline
  Press release about the discovery of the connection between the Blauhöhle and Vetterhöhle
 Description from showcaves.com

Caves of Germany
Karst caves
Landforms of Baden-Württemberg
Wild caves